Natalia Leite (born October 14, 1983) is a Brazilian writer and director.  She is best known for directing the indie hit film M.F.A., a feminist rape-revenge thriller that spurred debates at the start of the #MeToo movement. The film premiered at SXSW in 2017 where it was nominated for a Grand Jury Award and subsequently written about in The New York Times, CNN, and other outlets. Her feature film debut Bare premiered at the Tribeca Film Festival in 2015  and was released in US theaters by IFC and by Paramount Pictures. Leite is also a frequent contributor to Vice Media and is known to incorporate her documentary subjects into her scripted films. Her work has been described as having “a bracing, assertive style” (Variety) and as “cementing the reign over highly stylized, sexually progressive dramas” (Slant).

Early life

Leite was born and raised in São Paulo, Brazil. She later studied at the San Francisco Art Institute.

Leite began her career showcasing drawings, photography, and performance art films in galleries. In 2006, she moved to New York City where she started writing, directing, acting and producing her own micro-budget short films.  From these early works she was able to raise financing for her first feature film.

Career

Leite has directed feature films as well as documentaries. In her unscripted show for Vice Media, Every Woman, she lived and worked as a stripper in a truck-stop in New Mexico, which she discovered while location scouting for Bare. She went on to create a pilot for a Vice TV series with a similar concept in which she would immerse herself in different female-centric worlds as a form of first-person investigative journalism.

Her directorial debut, Bare, stars Dianna Agron, Paz de la Huerta, Chris Zylka, and Louisa Krause. Bare premiered at the Tribeca Film Festival in 2015 to positive reviews and was bought shortly after by IFC for domestic theatrical distribution and by Myriad Pictures for international.  Upon its premiere, Film Journal wrote "An award-winning director, Leite's portrait of Sarah's quest for identity is riveting for its storytelling and its direction." The Los Angeles Times wrote "Director Natalia Leite brings an emotional intelligence and sensitivity to Bare."

Leite's second feature film M.F.A. is a psychological thriller centered around rape crimes in a university and one art student who seeks revenge. The film premiered at SXSW in March 2017 to positive reviews and was nominated for a Grand Jury Award. It stars Francesca Eastwood, Clifton Collins Jr., and Peter Vack. The film has been described as a "David Fincher-style thriller," "bravely tackling the dark side of empowerment," and as "an angry as hell piece of pulpy and politicized pop cinema."

Frequently collaborating with Kyp Malone, Leite starred and co-directed the music video "Million Miles" for TV On The Radio.  Malone then went on to create the original score for the feature film Bare. Leite also co-created and starred in the comedy web-series Be Here Nowish.

Personal life
Leite is bisexual, and often deals with sexuality in her works.

Filmography

Film

Web

External links

 http://www.natalialeite.com

References

American film directors
American women film directors
Brazilian LGBT entertainers
Brazilian LGBT screenwriters
American LGBT screenwriters
American bisexual writers
Brazilian bisexual people
LGBT people from New York (state)
LGBT film directors
Living people
San Francisco Art Institute alumni
1984 births
Bisexual screenwriters
21st-century American women